Times interest earned (TIE) or interest coverage ratio is a measure of a company's ability to honor its debt payments. It may be calculated as either EBIT or EBITDA divided by the total interest expense.

 

When the interest coverage ratio is smaller than one, the company is not generating enough cash from its operations EBIT to meet its interest obligations. The company would then have to either use cash on hand to make up the difference or borrow funds. Typically, it is a warning sign when interest coverage falls below 2.5x.

Times interest earned definition

The times interest earned ratio indicates the extent of which earnings are available to meet interest payments.

A lower times interest earned ratio means less earnings are available to meet interest payments and that the business is more vulnerable to increases in interest rates and being unable to meet their existing outstanding loan obligations.

See also
Financial ratio
Financial leverage
EBIT
EBITDA
Debt service coverage ratio
EBITDA considered to be a better measure of Interest Coverage ratio.

References

External links
Free Video Tutorial Explaining The Concept Of Interest Coverage Ratio And Other Coverage Ratios
Chapter 10 Analysis of Financial Statements
Interest Coverage Ratio Rule of Thumb

Financial ratios